Shantanu Mohapatra (1936–2020) was an Indian musician, singer and composer. Apart from Odia, he sang in Hindi and Bengali language. He also directed music for Odia and Telugu films. During his lifetime, he composed music for more than 1,600 songs.

Early life 
Shantanu Mohapatra was born on January 6, 1936, in Baripada , Mayurbhanj district in Odisha. From the age of five, he learned music from Guru Banchhanidhi Panda.  He began performing on stage at the age of eight. In 1956, he graduated from IIT Kharagpur with a degree in Applied Geology and Geophysics. While studying at IIT, he became involved with the Indian People's Theatre Association (IPTA) and mastered the art of group music. He learned music direction from Salil Chowdhury.  In June 1956, he joined the Department of Mines & Geology, Government of Odisha and retired from there as a director. He worked as a geophysicist in Odisha Mining Corporation till retirement in 1994.

Music career 
Santanu Mahapatra made his debut as an Odia movie music composer in 1963 with the film Surjyamukhi. He composed music for 50 odd movies, features, telefilms, documentaries and especially art movies. He has also been credited as the first Odia music director to work in films in five different languages include Odia, Hindi, Bengali, Assamese and Telugu.

Mohapatra had composed the first modern Odia ballad 'Konark Gatha' with lyricist Gurukrushna Goswami and it was sung by Akshaya Mohanty. He has done more than 1,900 compositions, including 53 feature and telefilms films, 10 Jatras, 60 dramas by AIR (Cuttack) and 10 dance dramas to his credit.

Honors and awards  
 Lalit Kala Akademi Award – 2004
 Odisha Film Critics Award, 1995
 Mother Teresa Millennium Award, 2005

Death 
He died of pneumonia on December 30, 2020, at the age of 84.

References 

Indian male playback singers
1936 births
2020 deaths
20th-century Indian composers
20th-century Indian singers
Singers from Odisha
People from Baripada
20th-century Indian male singers